In computability theory and  computational complexity theory, a many-one reduction (also called mapping reduction) is a reduction which converts instances of one decision problem to another decision problems using an effective function. Where the instance reduced to is in the language  if the initial instance was in its language  and is not in the language  if the initial instance was not in its language . Thus if we can decide whether  instances are in the language , we can decide whether  instances are in its language by applying the reduction and solving . Thus, reductions can be used to measure the relative computational difficulty of two problems. That is to say, any algorithm that solves  can also be used as part of a (otherwise relatively simple) program that solves .

Many-one reductions are a special case and stronger form of Turing reductions. With many-one reductions, the oracle (that is, our solution for B) can be invoked only once at the end, and the answer cannot be modified. This means that if we want to show that problem A can be reduced to problem B, we can use our solution for B only once in our solution for A, unlike in Turing reduction, where we can use our solution for B as many times as needed while solving A.

This means that many-one reductions map instances of one problem to instances of another, while Turing reductions compute the solution to one problem, assuming the other problem is easy to solve. The many-one reduction is more effective at separating problems into distinct complexity classes. However, the increased restrictions on many-one reductions make them more difficult to find.

Many-one reductions were first used by Emil Post in a paper published in 1944. Later Norman Shapiro used the same concept in 1956 under the name strong reducibility.

Definitions

Formal languages 

Subsets of natural numbers 

if there exists a total computable function  with  iff .

Many-one equivalence and 1-equivalence 

Many-one completeness (m-completeness) 

Degrees
 is an equivalence relation, its equivalence classes are called m-degrees and form a poset  with the order induced by .p.257

Some properties of the m-degrees, some of which differ from analogous properties of Turing degrees:pp.555--581
 There is a well-defined jump operator on the m-degrees.
 The only m-degree with jump 0m′ is 0m.
 There are m-degrees  where there does not exist  where .
 Every countable linear order with a least element embeds into .

 is an equivalence relation, and its equivalences classes (called the 1-degrees) form a poset under . Myhill's isomorphism theorem can be stated as "for all sets  of natural numbers, ", which implies  and  have the same equivalence classes.p.325

Many-one reductions with resource limitations 

 the time needed for N plus the time needed for the reduction
 the maximum of the space needed for N and the space needed for the reduction

We say that a class C of languages (or a subset of the power set of the natural numbers) is closed under many-one reducibility if there exists no reduction from a language in C to a language outside C. If a class is closed under many-one reducibility, then many-one reduction can be used to show that a problem is in C by reducing a problem in C to it. Many-one reductions are valuable because most well-studied complexity classes are closed under some type of many-one reducibility, including P, NP, L, NL, co-NP, PSPACE, EXP, and many others. It is known for example that the first four listed are closed up to the very weak reduction notion of polylogarithmic time projections.  These classes are not closed under arbitrary many-one reductions, however.

Properties 
 The relations of many-one reducibility and 1-reducibility are transitive and reflexive and thus induce a preorder on the powerset of the natural numbers.
  if and only if 
 A set is many-one reducible to the halting problem if and only if it is recursively enumerable. This says that with regards to many-one reducibility, the halting problem is the most complicated of all recursively enumerable problems. Thus the halting problem is r.e. complete. Note that it is not the only r.e. complete problem.
 The specialized halting problem for an individual Turing machine T (i.e., the set of inputs for which T eventually halts) is many-one complete iff T is a universal Turing machine.  Emil Post showed that there exist recursively enumerable sets that are neither decidable nor m-complete, and hence that there exist nonuniversal Turing machines whose individual halting problems are nevertheless undecidable.

Karp reductions 
A polynomial-time many-one reduction from a problem A to a problem B (both of which are usually required to be decision problems) is a polynomial-time algorithm for transforming inputs to problem A into inputs to problem B, such that the transformed problem has the same output as the original problem. An instance x of problem A can be solved by applying this transformation to produce an instance y of problem B, giving y as the input to an algorithm for problem B, and returning its output. Polynomial-time many-one reductions may also be known as polynomial transformations or Karp reductions, named after Richard Karp.

References 

Reduction (complexity)